Sisurcana valida is a species of moth of the family Tortricidae. It is found in Rio de Janeiro, Brazil.

The wingspan is about 22 mm. The forewings have pale yellowish brown admixture and brownish strigulation (fine streaks). The hindwings are cream, mixed with brownish on the periphery. There is dense, brownish strigulation.

Etymology
The species name refers to the affirmation of its position and is derived from Latin validus (meaning valid).

References

Moths described in 2011
Sisurcana
Moths of South America
Taxa named by Józef Razowski